The Northern Governorate is one of the four governorates of Bahrain. It includes parts of the former municipalities of Al Mintaqah al Gharbiyah, Al Mintaqah al Wusta, Al Mintaqah al Shamaliyah, Jidd Haffs and Madinat Hamad.

Settlements in the Northern Governorate

Education
The Japanese School in Bahrain is located in Sar in the governorate.

See also

Al Garum Islands

References

External links
 Northern Governorate website

Governorates of Bahrain